Sherashovo is a rural locality (a selo) in Kabansky District, Republic of Buryatia, Russia. The population was 150 as of 2010.

Geography 
Sherashovo is located 51 km northeast of Kabansk (the district's administrative centre) by road. Inkino is the nearest rural locality.

References 

Rural localities in Kabansky District